Adolph Weiss (Baltimore, Maryland, November 12, 1891 – Van Nuys, California, February 21, 1971) was an American composer. A modernist, he was a pupil of Arnold Schoenberg in Vienna from 1924 to 1927; his father was a pupil of Ferruccio Busoni. He also served as a professional bassoonist in a number of orchestras, including the New York Philharmonic, the New York Symphony Society, the Rochester Symphony, the Los Angeles Philharmonic, the San Francisco Symphony, and the Chicago Symphony. His music was once described as being "fuller of crabs than Chesapeake Bay".

References

External links
Notes, autobiography
Adolph Weiss papers at the University of Maryland Libraries

American male composers
American classical bassoonists
1891 births
1971 deaths
Musicians from Baltimore
20th-century American composers
20th-century American male musicians